Khalil al-Hayya (Arabic: خليل الحية) is a senior Hamas official who was elected to the Palestinian Legislative Council on 25 January 2006 as a representative of Gaza City. He resides in the neighborhood of Shuja'iyya.

Seven or eight of his relatives, including two of his brothers, were killed by Israel during violence in the Israeli–Palestinian conflict 2007. One of his sons was killed by an Israeli airstrike in 2008 while leading a rocket brigade. Another son, daughter-in-law, and grandson were killed by an airstrike on his home in July 2014 during the 2014 Israel–Gaza conflict. He has called on the United Nations to recognize Palestine within its pre-1948 borders.

See also
 Ahmad Bahar

References

External links

Hamas members
Members of the 2006 Palestinian Legislative Council
People from Gaza City
Islamic University of Gaza alumni
Living people
Year of birth missing (living people)